The Mishmi languages consist of a few Sino-Tibetan languages spoken by the Mishmi people of Tibet, China and Arunachal Pradesh, India. They do not belong to a single branch or genetic grouping, but are rather a cultural grouping of various Sino-Tibetan languages that are not closely related to each other. The languages are:

Digaro languages (Northern Mishmi)
Idu Mishmi language
Digaro Mishmi language (Taraon)
Miju languages (Southern Mishmi)
Miju language (Midzu, Kaman)
Zakhring language (Meyor)

References

See also
Arunachal languages